Anita Chernewski (born 1946) is an American photographer. 

Her work is included in the collections of the Museum of Fine Arts Houston, 
the Getty Museum, and the Brooklyn Museum, New York.

References

Living people
1946 births
20th-century American photographers
21st-century American photographers
20th-century American women photographers
21st-century American women photographers